Barbara Brown may refer to:

 Barbara Brown (actress) (1901–1975), American actress
 Barbara Brown (athlete) (1941–1969), American Olympic athlete
 Barbara Brown (scientist) (1921–1999), American researcher and popularizer of biofeedback and neurofeedback
 Barbara Brown (figure skater) (born 1953), American figure skater
 Barbara Elaine Russell Brown (1929–2019), American biologist and philanthropist
 Barbara Illingworth Brown (1924–2016), biochemist and researcher of metabolic disorders
 Barbara Brown (died 2010), lead singer of vocal group Barbara and the Browns
 Barbara Brown, occasional alias of Barbara Bonfiglio (born 1975), also known as Misstress Barbara, Canadian house music producer
 Barbara Brown, co-founder of Northwestern Polytechnic University
 Barbara Brown, character in American Psycho 2
 Barbara Brown, television director and script supervisor

See also
 Barbara Brown's titi (Callicebus barbarabrownae), a Brazilian species of monkey
Bairbre de Brún, Irish politician